Telephone number portability can refer to:

Mobile number portability - telephone number portability for mobile phone users.
Local number portability - telephone number portability for landline users.
Toll-free number portability - telephone number portability for freephone subscribers.

Technology and engineering disambiguation pages